Deschampsia angusta is a species of grass in the family Poaceae. It is found in Kenya and Uganda. Its natural habitat is Alpine wetlands.

References

angusta
Flora of Kenya
Flora of Uganda
Vulnerable plants
Taxonomy articles created by Polbot